Nesmy is a commune in the Vendée department in the Pays de la Loire region in western France.

Nesmy is part of the Communauté d'agglomération La Roche-sur-Yon Agglomération (before 2010, it was : the Communauté de Communes du Pays Yonnais).

Geography
The river Yon forms most of the commune's north-eastern border.

Sights and culture
Nesmy is famous for its potteries and tileries, an artisanal tradition.

The area has many hiking trails, points of interest include:
 The Mill of Rambourg, a water mill
 The Yon river
 The Old Pottery of Nesmy
 A private Castle 
 La Domangère golf course, internationally famous

Miscellaneous
Nesmy houses the Zone of Activities of Le Chaillot, near to the A87 motorway.

Twin towns
Nesmy is twinned with Burggen, in Bavaria, which is close to the Alps in Germany, allowing for regular meetings.

Personalities
 Gilbert Prouteau: writer born in Nesmy
 Henri Laborit: scientist and artist
 Gérard Potier: artist and actor-storyteller

See also
Communes of the Vendée department

References

External links

 NESMY, official web site
 La Roche sur Yon Agglomération
 Office du Tourisme du Pays Yonnais 
 Gilbert PROUTEAU 
 Le Golf de La Domangère 
 La Vieille Poterie Artisanale de Nesmy 
 Le Moulin de Rambourg à Nesmy

Communes of Vendée